Eugene de Blaas, also known as Eugene von Blaas or Eugenio Blaas (24 July 1843 – 10 February 1931), was an Italian painter in the school known as Academic Classicism.

Life and career

He was born at Albano, near Rome, to a Tyrolean father and Italian mother. His father Karl, also a painter, was his teacher. His mother, Agnesina Auda, was a well-to-do Roman woman. The family moved to Venice when Karl became professor at the Academy of Venice. He often painted scenes in Venice, but also portraits and religious paintings.

Works
Among his works are La forma nuziale in sacrestia; La tombola in Campiello a Venezia; Una scena di burattini in un educandato; and La Ninetta. The art critic Luigi Chirtani, when the painting was displayed at the Mostra Nazionale di Venezia, described it as "[b]eautiful, flattering, pretty, caressed, cleaned, polished, laundress in a painting by Mr. Blaas, the favorite portraitist of great Venetian aristocrats, dressed in gala satins, shining jewelry, hairstyles of the rich."

His colorful and rather theatrical period images of Venetian society, e.g. On the Balcony (1877; Private Collection), were quite different compared to delicate pastels and etchings of the courtyards, balcony and canals of modern Venice.

Eugene de Blaas' paintings were exhibited at the Royal Academy, Fine Art Society, New Gallery and Arthur Tooth and Sons Gallery in London, and also at the Walker Art Gallery in Liverpool.

Paintings

 The Sisters 1878 (Cloister-Scene)
 Conversions of the Rhætians by St. Valentine Cimabue and Giotto Scene from the Decameron Dogaressa Going to Church Venetian Balcony Scene God's Creatures Bridal Procession, in San Marco Venetian Masquerade A Journey to Murano (Vienna Museum)
 Die Wasserträgerin (1887)
 On the Beach (1908)
 In the Water (1914)
 maiden gathering flowers

Works

Cultural reference
Salim Ghazi Saeedi has dedicated a song entitled "For Eugene, Distilling the Delicacy" to Eugene de Blaas in his 2011 album, Human Encounter''.

Notes

References

 Biography of old oil painting master Eugene de Blaas
  (Text in German and English)

External links
 
 Eugene de Blaas at artrenewal.org

1932 deaths
1843 births
People from Albano Laziale
19th-century Italian painters
Italian male painters
Academic art
Italian people of Austrian descent
Italian genre painters
Italian costume genre painters
20th-century Italian painters
Academic staff of the Accademia di Belle Arti di Venezia
19th-century Italian male artists
20th-century Italian male artists